MCLA is an abbreviation that may refer to:
 Massachusetts College of Liberal Arts
 Men's Collegiate Lacrosse Association
 Midnight Club: Los Angeles